NGC 341 is a spiral galaxy in the constellation Cetus. It was discovered on October 21, 1881 by Édouard Stephan. It was described by Dreyer as "faint, pretty large, round, a little brighter middle, mottled but not resolved." It has a companion galaxy, PGC 3627, which is sometimes called NGC 341B. For this, reason, it has been included in Halton Arp's Atlas of Peculiar Galaxies.

References

External links
 

0341
03620
059
-02-03-063
18811021
Cetus (constellation)
Intermediate spiral galaxies